Agriculture, Ecosystems & Environment is an international peer-reviewed scientific journal published eighteen times per year by Elsevier. It covers research on the interrelationships between the natural environments and agroecosystems, and their effects on each other. The editors-in-chief are Tom Veldkamp and Yong Li.

History 
The journal in its current form originated in 1983 from a merger between Agriculture and Environment and Agro-Ecosystems, both of which were established in 1974.

Abstracting and indexing
This journal is abstracted and indexed in:

According to the Journal Citation Reports, the journal has a 2019 impact factor of 4.241.

References

External links
 

Elsevier academic journals
Bimonthly journals
Publications established in 1974
Agricultural journals
Environmental science journals